Josef Klapuch (10 February 1906 – 18 December 1985) was a Czechoslovak wrestler. He was born in Zbyslavice in February 1906. He won an Olympic silver medal in Freestyle wrestling in 1936. Klapuch died on 18 December 1985, at the age of 79.

References

1906 births
1985 deaths
Czechoslovak male sport wrestlers
Olympic wrestlers of Czechoslovakia
Wrestlers at the 1936 Summer Olympics
Czech male sport wrestlers
Olympic silver medalists for Czechoslovakia
Olympic medalists in wrestling
Medalists at the 1936 Summer Olympics
Czech actors